This is a discography of the Russian poet and musician Egor Letov.

Grazhdanskaya Oborona

Studio albums 
 Poganaya molodyozh' (Foul Youth) (1985)
 Optimizm (Optimism) (1985)
 Myshelovka (Mousetrap) (1987)
 Khorosho!! (Good!) (1987)
 Totalitarizm (Totalitarianism) (1987)
 Nekrofiliya (Necrophilia) (1987)
 Krasnyy albom (Red Album) (1987)
 Vse idet po planu (Everything is going according to the plan)(1988)
 Tak zakalyalas stal (This is how the steel was tempered) (1988)
 Boevoi stimul (Combat Stimulus) (1988)
 Toshnota (Nausea)  (1989)
 Pesni radosti i schastya (Songs of joy and happiness) (1989)
  (Great and eternal) (1989)
 Armageddon-pops (Armageddon-pops)(1989)
 Voina (War) (1989)
 Russkoe pole eksperimentov (Russian Field of Experiments  (1989)
 Instruktsiya po vyzhivaniyu (Instructions for survival) (1990)
 Solntsevorot (Solstice) (1995)
  (The unbearable lightness of being) (1996)
 Zvezdopad (Starfall) (2001)
 Dolgaya schastlivaya zhizn (Long happy life) (2004)
 Reanimatsiya (Reanimation) (2005)
 Zachem snyatsya sny? (Why do we have dreams) (2007)

Live albums 
 Russky proryv v Leningrade (Russian Breakthrough in Leningrad) (1994)
 Kontsert v MEI 17.02.90 (Concert in MEI (17.02.90)) (1996)
 Posledny kontsert v Talline (The Last Concert in Tallinn) (1996)
 Kontsert (Concert) (1997)
  (Chairs and Lights)  (2001)
 XX let (20 years) (2006)
 Vystuplenie v klube Rok-Siti  (Performance at the Rock City Club) (2007)
 Apelsin: Elektrichestvo (Orange: Electricity) (2010)

Compilations 
 Istoriya: Posev 1982-1985  (History: Posev 1982-1985) (1989)
 Khuy cherez plecho (Cock over your shoulder) ( (1990)
 Pops (album) (Pops) (1992)
 Legendy russkogo roka (Legends of Russian rock) (2001)
 Poezd ushel  (The Train left) (2002)

Singles 
 "Elektrichesky Pyos" (Electric Dog) (2012)

Egor i Opizdenevshie 
 Pryg-skok (Jump-skip)  (1990)
 Sto let odinochestva (100 years of solitude)  (1992)
 Psychodelia Tomorrow (Psychodelia Tomorrow) (2000)

Kommunizm 
 Na sovetskoi skorosti (At Soviet speed) (1988)
 Suleiman Stalsky (Suleyman Stalsky) (1988)
 Veselyashchy gaz (Laughing gas) (1989)
 Rodina slyshit (The motherland hears) (1989)
 Soldatsky son (Soldier's Dream) (1989)
 Chudo-muzyka (Miracle Music) (1989)
 Narodovedenie (Folk Studies) (1989)
 Satanizm (Satanism) (1989)
 Zhizn, chto skazka (Life is like a Fairy Tale) (1989)
 Let It Bi (Let it Be) (1989)
 Igra v samoletiki pod krovatyu (The Airplane Game under the bed) (1989)
 Leniniana (Leniniana) (1989)
 13 (13) (1990)
 Khronika pikiruyushchego bombardirovshchika (Chronicle of a Dive Bomber) (1990)
 Blagodat: The Best of Kommunizm (Grace: The Best of Communism) (1990)
 Granitsa schastya (The Border of Happiness) (2021)

Solo work

Studio albums 
 Russkoe pole eksperimenta (akustika) (Russian Fields of Experiments (Ascoustic)) (1988)
 Vershki i koreshki (Tops and Roots)(1989)
 Vse kak u lyudei (Everything is like other people) (1989)
 Muzyka vesny (Music of Spring) (1994)

Live albums 
 Kontsert v Gorode-Geroe Leningrade (Concert in the hero-city Leningrad) (1994)
 Kontsert v O.G.I. (Concert in O.G.I) (2002) (with Sergei Letov)
 Apelsin: Akustika (Orange: Acoustic) (2006)

Compilations 
 Izbrannoe (Favourites) (2006)

Letov, Egor